Swepsonville is a town in Alamance County, North Carolina, United States. It is part of the Burlington, North Carolina Metropolitan Statistical Area. The population at the 2010 census was 1,154.

Geography
Swepsonville is located at  (36.026744, -79.354849).

Demographics

2020 census

As of the 2020 United States census, there were 2,445 people, 796 households, and 531 families residing in the town.

2000 census
At the 2000 census, there were 922 people, 383 households, and 271 families residing in the town. The population density was 894.5 people per square mile (345.6/km). There were 405 housing units at an average density of 392.9/sq mi (151.8/km). The racial makeup of the town was 94.03% White, 3.80% African American, 0.43% Asian, 0.54% from other races, and 1.19% from two or more races. Hispanic or Latino of any race were 1.84% of the population.

There were 383 households, out of which 29.2% had children under the age of 18 living with them, 60.1% were married couples living together, 8.6% had a female householder with no husband present, and 29.2% were non-families. 25.1% of all households were made up of individuals, and 9.4% had someone living alone who was 65 years of age or older. The average household size was 2.41 and the average family size was 2.86.

In the town, the population was spread out, with 23.2% under the age of 18, 5.1% from 18 to 24, 28.5% from 25 to 44, 30.3% from 45 to 64, and 12.9% who were 65 years of age or older. The median age was 41 years. For every 100 females, there were 88.5 males. For every 100 females age 18 and over, there were 91.9 males.

The median income for a household in the town was $51,719, and the median income for a family was $60,147. Males had a median income of $38,125 versus $27,222 for females. The per capita income for the town was $26,047. About 4.8% of families and 6.5% of the population were below the poverty line, including 3.7% of those under age 18 and 8.2% of those age 65 or over.

Honda
The Honda Motor Company manufactures general purpose engines, walk-behind lawn mowers, snow blowers, string trimmers, water pumps, and tillers in Swepsonville.

History
Swepsonville was named for the builder of a mill on the western side of town. Swepson disappeared one night with a considerable amount of money and soon established a mill in the North. The old mill, unused for many years, burned down in 1989 in a ten-alarm fire which brought firetrucks from all surrounding counties, was visible from the freeway 3 miles away, and made the national news.

A major league ballplayer, Dusty Cooke, came from Swepsonville. He played for the Yankees, the Red Sox and the Reds from 1930–1938, and managed the Phillies in 1948.

Notable person
Dusty Cooke, Major League Baseball player and manager

References

External links

 Town of Swepsonville official website

Towns in North Carolina
Towns in Alamance County, North Carolina